Naim García García (born 11 June 2002) is a Spanish professional footballer who plays as a left winger for SD Ponferradina, on loan from CD Leganés.

Club career
Born in Madrid, García joined Real Madrid's La Fábrica in 2012, from CD Colmenar de Oreja. In 2016, he left the club and signed for neighbouring CD Leganés.

On 7 March 2019, García signed his first professional contract with the Pepineros. On 14 August 2021, before even having appeared for the reserves, he made his professional debut by starting in a 0–1 Segunda División away loss against Real Sociedad B.

On 7 December 2021, after already being established in the first team squad, García renewed his contract with Leganés until 2027. He scored his first professional goal the following 21 May, netting his team's third in a 3–0 away win over SD Ponferradina.

On 31 January 2023, García was loaned to Ponfe for the remainder of the season.

References

External links
Real Madrid profile 

2002 births
Living people
Footballers from Madrid
Spanish footballers
Association football wingers
Segunda División players
CD Leganés players
SD Ponferradina players